The 2020 UEFA Europa League Final was the final match of the 2019–20 UEFA Europa League, the 49th season of Europe's secondary club football tournament organised by UEFA, and the 11th season since it was renamed from the UEFA Cup to the UEFA Europa League. It was played at the RheinEnergieStadion in Cologne, Germany on 21 August 2020, between Spanish side Sevilla and Italian side Inter Milan. The match was held behind closed doors due to the COVID-19 pandemic in Europe.

The final was originally scheduled to be played on 27 May 2020 at the Stadion Energa Gdańsk in Gdańsk, Poland. However, UEFA announced on 23 March 2020 that the final was postponed due to the COVID-19 pandemic. On 17 June 2020, the UEFA Executive Committee chose to relocate the final to Cologne, as part of a "final-eight tournament" consisting of single-match knockout ties played in four stadiums across Germany.

Sevilla won the match 3–2 for their record sixth UEFA Cup/Europa League title. As winners, they earned the right to play against the winners of the 2019–20 UEFA Champions League, Bayern Munich, in the 2020 UEFA Super Cup. They also qualified to enter the group stage of the 2020–21 UEFA Champions League; since Sevilla had already qualified through their league performance, the berth reserved was given to the third-placed team of the 2019–20 Ligue 1 (Rennes), the 5th-ranked association according to next season's access list.

Teams
In the following table, finals until 2009 were in the UEFA Cup era, since 2010 were in the UEFA Europa League era.

Venue

The UEFA Executive Committee chose RheinEnergieStadion in Cologne as the host at their meeting on 17 June 2020. This was the first UEFA club competition final hosted at the stadium and the first Europa League final held in Germany since 2010. During the two-legged final era, the country hosted either one or both legs 11 times, before hosting the single-legged 2001 UEFA Cup Final in Dortmund and the 2010 final in Hamburg.

The stadium was first opened in 1923 as the Müngersdorfer Stadion and has been the home stadium of German Bundesliga side 1. FC Köln since 1948. It underwent two major renovations during its lifetime. It hosted UEFA Euro 1988 as well as the 2005 FIFA Confederations Cup and the 2006 FIFA World Cup.

Background
The match was a record-extending sixth UEFA Cup/Europa League final for Sevilla, the most successful team in competition history. The club won all their prior finals in 2006, 2007, 2014, 2015 and 2016.

Inter Milan reached their fifth UEFA Cup/Europa League final, second only to Sevilla. They previously won three finals in 1991, 1994 and 1998, and lost to Schalke 04 in 1997. They were the first Italian team to reach a UEFA Cup/Europa League final since Parma in 1999.

Road to the final

Note: In all results below, the score of the finalist is given first (H: home; A: away; N: neutral).

Pre-match

Identity
The original identity of the 2020 UEFA Europa League Final was unveiled at the group stage draw on 30 August 2019.

Ambassador
The original ambassador for the Gdańsk final was former Polish international Andrzej Buncol, who won the 1987–88 UEFA Cup with Bayer Leverkusen.

Officials
On 18 August 2020, UEFA named Dutchman Danny Makkelie as the referee for the final. Makkelie had been a FIFA referee since 2011, and was previously an additional assistant referee in the 2018 UEFA Europa League Final and the video assistant referee in the 2019 UEFA Champions League Final. He was also an assistant video assistant referee in the 2018 FIFA World Cup Final. He was joined by four of his fellow countrymen, with Mario Diks and Hessel Steegstra as assistant referees, Jochem Kamphuis as the video assistant referee and Kevin Blom as one of the assistant VAR officials. The other assistant VAR for the final was Paweł Gil from Poland, with his compatriot Tomasz Sokolnicki serving as the offside VAR official. Anastasios Sidiropoulos of Greece was the fourth official.

Match

Details
The "home" team (for administrative purposes) was determined by an additional draw held on 10 July 2020 (after the quarter-final and semi-final draws), at the UEFA headquarters in Nyon, Switzerland.

Statistics

See also
2020 UEFA Champions League Final
2020 UEFA Women's Champions League Final
2020 UEFA Super Cup
Inter Milan in European football
Sevilla FC in European football

Notes

References

External links

2020
Final
August 2020 sports events in Germany
Sevilla FC matches
2019–20 in Spanish football
Inter Milan matches
2019–20 in Italian football
2020
International club association football competitions hosted by Germany
2020s in Cologne
2019–20 in German football
Association football events postponed due to the COVID-19 pandemic